Travis Colyer (born 24 August 1991) is a professional Australian rules footballer playing for the Fremantle Football Club in the Australian Football League (AFL).

Early career
Colyer was selected by Essendon with the 26th pick in the 2009 AFL Draft. He previously played for Claremont in the WAFL and Trinity College, Perth. He also represented Western Australia in the 2009 AFL National Under 18 Championships and was named in the 2009 U18 All Australian team.

AFL career

Colyer played his first AFL game against  in round 3 of the 2010 AFL season.

Colyer, along with 33 other Essendon players, was found guilty of using a banned performance enhancing substance, thymosin beta-4, as part of Essendon's sports supplements program during the 2012 season. He and his team-mates were initially found not guilty in March 2015 by the AFL Anti-Doping Tribunal, but a guilty verdict was returned in January 2016 after an appeal by the World Anti-Doping Agency. He was suspended for two years which, with backdating, ended in November 2016; as a result, he served approximately fourteen months of his suspension and missed the entire 2016 AFL season.

On 17 October 2018, in the final minutes of the 2018 AFL Trade Period, Colyer was traded to the Fremantle Football Club, for a future fourth-round selection, after nine seasons and eighty-seven games with Essendon.

2021 saw Colyer have a career best season in which he played every game and kicked fifteen goals. Colyer signed a one year contract extension at the end of the 2021 AFL season tying him to Fremantle until at least 2022.

Statistics
 Statistics are correct to the end of round 10, 2022

|- style="background-color: #EAEAEA" 
| 2010 ||  || 32 || 11 || 7 || 10 || 102 || 100 || 202 || 31 || 33 || 0.6 || 0.9 || 9.3 || 9.1 || 18.4 || 2.8 || 3.0
|-
| 2011 ||  || 32 || 10 || 7 || 7 || 73 || 32 || 105 || 25 || 18 || 0.7 || 0.7 || 7.3 || 3.2 || 10.5 || 2.5 || 1.8
|- style="background-color: #EAEAEA" 
| 2012 ||  || 32 || 6 || 3 || 4 || 50 || 22 || 72 || 15 || 15 || 0.5 || 0.7 || 8.3 || 3.7 || 12.0 || 2.5 || 2.5
|-
| 2013 ||  || 32 || 7 || 5 || 3 || 57 || 32 || 89 || 26 || 10 || 0.7 || 0.4 || 8.1 || 4.6 || 12.7 || 3.7 || 1.4
|- style="background-color: #EAEAEA" 
| 2014 ||  || 32 || 12 || 7 || 8 || 143 || 60 || 203 || 56 || 29 || 0.6 || 0.7 || 11.9 || 5.0 || 16.9 || 4.7 || 2.4
|-
| 2015 ||  || 32 || 11 || 11 || 4 || 113 || 65 || 178 || 41 || 30 || 1.0 || 0.4 || 10.3 || 5.9 || 16.2 || 3.7 || 2.7
|- style="background-color: #EAEAEA" 
| 2016 ||  || 32 || 0 || — || — || — || — || — || — || — || — || — || — || — || — || — || —
|-
| 2017 ||  || 32 || 22 || 12 || 13 || 208 || 160 || 368 || 86 || 63 || 0.5 || 0.6 || 9.5 || 7.3 || 16.7 || 3.9 || 2.9
|- style="background-color: #EAEAEA" 
| 2018 ||  || 32 || 8 || 2 || 2 || 60 || 47 || 107 || 31 || 16 || 0.3 || 0.3 || 7.5 || 5.9 || 13.4 || 3.9 || 2.0
|-
| 2019 ||  || 33
| 10 || 5 || 6 || 91 || 54 || 145 || 32 || 23 || 0.5 || 0.6 || 9.1 || 5.4 || 14.5 || 3.2 || 2.3
|- style="background-color: #EAEAEA" 
| 2020 ||  || 33 || 9 || 3 || 2 || 54 || 26 || 80 || 16 || 9 || 0.3 || 0.2 || 6.0 || 2.9 || 8.9 || 1.8 || 1.0
|-
| 2021 ||  || 33
| 22 || 15 || 19 || 195 || 83 || 278 || 75 || 44 || 0.7 || 0.9 || 8.9 || 3.8 || 12.6 || 3.4 || 2.0
|- style="background-color: #EAEAEA" 
| 2022 ||  || 33 || 9 || 5 || 2 || 78 || 29 || 107 || 28 || 19 || 0.6 || 0.2 || 8.7 || 3.2 || 11.9 || 3.1 || 2.1
|- class="sortbottom"
! colspan=3| Career
! 137
! 82
! 80
! 1224
! 710
! 1934
! 462
! 309
! 0.6
! 0.6
! 8.9
! 5.2
! 14.1
! 3.4
! 2.3
|}

Notes

References

External links

Fremantle Football Club players
Essendon Football Club players
Living people
1991 births
Australian rules footballers from Western Australia
People educated at Trinity College, Perth
Claremont Football Club players
Doping cases in Australian rules football
Bendigo Football Club players
Peel Thunder Football Club players